Anoosh Masood Chaudhry is a Pakistani police officer who serves as the deputy director, Administration, for Elite Police of Punjab, Pakistan since 26 September 2019. She was named as Lahore's best crime fighter for 2018. She became the first female Assistant Superintendent of Police (ASP) from Khyber Pakhtunkhwa province of Pakistan on 11 December 2014.

Education
She completed her MBBS from Fatima Jinnah Medical College and received a gold medal in medicine. She is then trained at CSA for 40th Common Training Program and at NPA Islamabad for Specialized Training.

Career
She started her career as a medical doctor and won a gold medal in medicine before entering into the career of law enforcement. She performed a house job at Mayo Hospital for one year. In 2008, she was the youngest attendee at SAARC International Conference of Dermatology.

Initially, she joined Punjab Police in Lahore as an ASP but then moved to Abbottabad on 11 December 2014, retaining her rank of ASP in Khyber Pakhtunkhwa Police. In that role, she became the first female ASP of Khyber Pakhtunkhwa province. She was again transferred to Punjab Police serving as Superintendent of Police (SP) of the Investigation Branch in Kasur.

On 20 October 2018, she was posted to Lahore as Additional SP of the investigation department of Model Town. There, she achieved the honor of being the best crime fighter in the year 2018 for the city of Lahore. Under her leadership, the police station filed 74 percent of challans successfully in 2018. She belonged to the 40th Common Training Programme of Police Service of Pakistan.

In a performance measure evaluated by Lahore's Investigation Headquarters for the first few months of 2019, she was declared the most outstanding officer of the investigation wing out of all SPs serving the six divisions of Lahore.

On 1 May 2019, she was posted as SP of Punjab Police Headquarters in Lahore.

On 26 September 2019, she was appointed as Deputy Director Administration for Elite Police of Punjab in Lahore by the Inspector General of Punjab Police, Arif Nawaz Khan.

On 8 December 2020, she was prematurely transferred  and directed to report at Establishment Division by IGP Dr. Inam Ghani.

In May 2022, Anoosh was appointed as senior superintendent (SSP) of Lahore's operations wing. She became the first woman police officer posted as SSP Operations Lahore.

Family
Her husband is from Abbottabad, and she also has a daughter.

See also
Central Superior Services

References

Pakistani police officers
Pakistani women police officers
Khyber Pakhtunkhwa Police
Punjab Police (Pakistan)
Year of birth missing (living people)
Place of birth missing (living people)
Living people
Fatima Jinnah Medical University alumni